Affrilachia is a term that focuses on the cultural contributions of African-American artists, writers, and musicians in the Appalachian region of the United States. The term "Affrilachia" is attributed to Kentucky-based writer Frank X Walker, who began using it in the 1990s as a way to negate the stereotype of Appalachian culture, which portrays Appalachians as predominantly white and living in small mountain communities. Walker could be said to have made this word global. The term Affrilachian stands for an African American who is a native or resident in the Appalachian region. Affrilachia is also the title of Walker's 2000 book of poetry, published by Old Cove Press.

Frank X Walker co-founded The Affrilachian Poets and in 2009, created The Affrilachian Journal of Arts and Culture. Frank X Walker is a graduate of the University of Kentucky, currently serving as an associate professor in the UK Department of English. Walker’s partnership with the University of Kentucky allowed him to also create and teach an educational program on African-American and Africana studies, which further contributed to and raised awareness of Affrilachian art, culture, and history. The word "Affrilachia" is included in the second edition of the Oxford American Dictionary. 

In 2011, Marie T. Cochran created the Affrilachian Artist Project with the goal of building a sustainable collaborative network among the region’s artists and community organizers. Today, the project has over 2,000 members and has organized several Affrilachian-themed art exhibitions.

Members 
The Appalachian region has more than thirty prominent art community members who identify with the term Affrilachian, including writers, musicians, and artists such as Frank X Walker, Nikky Finney, Kelly Norman Ellis, Mitchell L. H. Douglas, Crystal Wilkinson, Parneshia Jones, Ricardo Nazario y Colón, Ellen Hagan, and Keith S. Wilson. As of March 2022, 3.4K people currently follow the Affrilachian Artist Project's Facebook page.

Culture

Literature 
Frank X Walker wrote Isaac Murphy: I Dedicate This Ride (2010), Masked Man, Black: Pandemic and Protest Poems (2020), Black Box: Poems (2006), and Affrilachia: Poems by Frank X Walker (2000). 

Crystal Wilkinson is the author of the books The Birds of Opulence (2016), Water Street (2011), Blackberries, Blackberries (2000), and Perfect Black (2021).

In 2018, Affrilachian poets celebrated 25 years since the term was created in the book, Black Bone: 25 Years of the Affrilachian Poets edited by Bianca Lynn Spriggs and Jeremy Paden, published by The University Press of Kentucky. This book had contributions from Frank X Walker himself along with other prominent members of the Affrilachian literary community.

Visual Arts 
Appalachia is also home to vibrant African American art communities. In 2011, artist, educator, and curator Marie Cochran started the western North Carolina-based Affrilachian Artist Project to combat the common perception of Appalachia as a racially homogenous, white region. She co-curated the Affrilachian Artist Project's inaugural exhibition at the August Wilson Cultural Center in Pittsburgh, PA. A traveling version of the exhibit, which includes work by LaKeisha Blount, Victoria Casey-McDonald, and Rahkie Mateen, has been hosted by galleries throughout Appalachia.

Music

History
African Americans, including those who identify as Affrilachian, have had a significant impact on the sound of Appalachian music over the years. The start of African American influence on Appalachian music began when individuals were forcefully brought from West Africa to the United States and put into slavery. Along with West African enslaved musicians came various stringed instruments made from gourds, such as the ngoni, that would later become the banjo, an instrument that is common in Appalachian music.  The enslaved West African musicians played stringed instruments using a unique picking technique called “clawhammer”, which has become a popular banjo style in the Appalachian region.

African Americans continued to influence Appalachian music on plantations, where work songs and spirituals were frequently sung, and into the 19th and early 20th centuries.  By this time, string music began to be associated with minstrelsy and black-face performances, so African American musicians distanced themselves from it. Some modern string bands, however, such as the now-disbanded Carolina Chocolate Drops, have worked to reclaim Appalachian music for the Affrilachian community. With members including Rhiannon Giddens and Dom Flemons, the Carolina Chocolate Drops won a Grammy for Best Traditional Folk Album in 2011.

Cuisine 
Affrilachian food and cuisine has slight variations from region to region, just like the rest of Appalachian culture. Some of the staples across Affrilachian cuisine are the practices of preserving produce through pickling, fermenting, and canning as well as drying out other crops such as beans and corn. Much of the food that is eaten in the various Appalachian regions has historically included the crops that families could grow themselves or trade for at local markets. Another Affrilachian staple is the style of pan-frying many different dishes using butter as opposed to neutral oils. Rufus Estes has differentiated his fried chicken from many others using the "pan-fried in butter" method.

Molasses and sorghum are frequently used in baking and as sweeteners. Vegetables such as okra, kale, collard greens, sweet potatoes, and cabbage are prevalent in Affrilachian cooking as are a variety of beans grown in the region. Cornbread is a common side dish. Fruit cobblers and sweet potato pies are popular desserts.

Malinda Russel has been coined as an influential member of Affrilachia because of the cookbook The Domestic Cookbook: Containing a Careful Selection of Useful Receipts for the Kitchen that she published and her "Washington Cake" that gained fame from its combination of citrus and spiced flavors.

References 

African-American culture
African-American history in Appalachia
Appalachian writers
Appalachian culture
Affrilachian Poets
Affrilachian writers